18 Bronzemen is a 1976 Hong Kong kung fu film directed by Joseph Kuo. It is one of the Shaolin themed films, concerning their battles against the Qing Dynasty.

A sequel, called Return of the 18 Bronzemen, followed and was released in the same year.

Plot

The much-reviled Qing government decide to eradicate any opposition to their rule by attacking pro-Ming families in the kingdom. One such attack sees an influential official killed, though his wife and son manage to escape thanks to the intervention of a close ally. While on the run, the son, Shao Lung, is aided by his father's close friend (Jack Long) who teaches the young boy the basics of kung-fu. As time passes, the renegades must once again move on and evade capture by the Qing army. However, it is decided that the safest place for Shaolung to hide would be in the Ming-friendly Shaolin Temple where he could also further his knowledge of kung-fu. Once there, the boy finds the severe, disciplined lifestyle hard to cope with and, despite his best efforts, he lags behind his fellow pupils. Over time he makes two close friends and it is their encouragement that drives him to reach his goals. Now a young man, Shao Lung (Tien Peng) gradually develops into a formidable fighter and concentrates his sights on leaving Shaolin to avenge his father's death. However, to 'graduate' from Shaolin means to defeat the Shaolin bronzemen and a series of fiendish tests. His first attempt to conquer these trials is unsuccessful, but Shaolung is spurred on by his straight-talking friend (Wong) and finally leaves through Shaolin's hallowed gates after a tremendous effort. Once through the dreaded chambers, the Shaolin disciples have the Shaolin crest of the dragon and tiger burnt into their forearms by lifting a huge bronze pot. Outside, the heroes meet up with more patriots. Shao Lung meets his uncle who tells him the true story of his past and gives him half of a royal seal, the other half belonging to his (unknown) future wife. Once on his journey again his constantly stalked by a young "man" (actually a woman in disguise), Miss Lu. After defending him from an assassination attempt, Miss Lu constantly claims that Shao Lung owes her his life, though he is still under the impression she is still a man (a typical recurring plot device in some martial arts films though she is obviously a woman). After another failed attempt at Shao Lung, he manages to come across Miss Lu's half of the royal seal thus revealing she is a woman and also his wife-to-be. Shao Lung and Miss Lu meet up with Brother Wan, and in turn they meet with Brother Ta-Chi who managed to beat the Bronzemen and leave Shaolin. Ta-Chi is a mole who was placed in Shaolin by the Qings to learn kung-fu and to eventually kill Shao Lung. Shao Lung and Brother Wan manage to kill their former brother in self-defense, and with Miss Lu, move on to kill the Manchu general.

Cast
Chiang Nan – Brother Ta-Chi
Jack Long – Young Ta-Chi
Tien Peng – Shao Lung
Polly Shang Kuan – Miss Lu
Carter Wong – Brother Wan

Reception
In his book Horror and Science Fiction Film IV, Donald C Willis reviewed 18 Bronzemen as a "routine martial arts actioner" noting a "long bizarre sequence in which Shao Lin students face the Bronzemen".

References

External links

 
 18 Bronzemen at Hong Kong Cinemagic

1976 films
Hong Kong martial arts films
Kung fu films
Films set in 17th-century Qing dynasty
Films directed by Joseph Kuo
1970s Hong Kong films